Mooroobool is a suburb of Cairns in the Cairns Region, Queensland, Australia.

Geography

Mooroobool has a mixture of dwellings which are mainly residential and commercial properties. Nearby suburbs are Earlville and Kanimbla.

History
Mooroobool is situated in the Yidinji traditional Aboriginal country. 
The suburb was named by the Queensland Place Names Board on 1 September 1973. The origin of the suburb name is from the geographical feature Mooroobool Peak located west from the suburb, named from an Aboriginal word meaning 'meeting of the waters'. 
  
Kingsford Street is named after Richard Ash Kingsford, who was mayor of Cairns from 1885-1886 and in 1889.

Balaclava State School opened on 2 February 1954.

Amenities 
Mooroobool has a Campbell’s Super IGA and a police beat.

Education 
Balaclava State School is a government primary (Prep-6) school for boys and girls at 418 Mulgrave Road. In 2017, the school had an enrolment of 353 students with 31 teachers (29 full-time equivalent) and 26 non-teaching staff (17 full-time equivalent). The school was a special education program.

References

External links
 

Suburbs of Cairns